Amal Neerad Productions is an Indian film production company based in Kerala, founded by Amal Neerad, an Indian film director and cinematographer. The company has produced 6 films since 2012.

Films

References

Amal Neerad – IMDb
IBN Live, Dulquer Salman to play lead in Amal Neerad's next
The Times of India, Amal Neerad's next with Dulquer!
Deccan chronicle, Ranadaive to crank camera for Amal Neerad
Onlookers Media, Amal Neerad and Anwar Rasheed to come up with Dulquer and Fahad project in 2016!

External links
 Official Facebook
 IMDB

Film production companies of Kerala
2012 establishments in Kerala
Indian companies established in 2012
Mass media companies established in 2012